The 2003 season was the 12th full year of competitive football in the Baltic country as an independent nation. The Estonia national football team played a total number of seventeen international matches in 2003. The team ended up in fourth place in European Qualification Group 8 for Euro 2004, with two wins, two draws and four defeats.

Ecuador vs Estonia

Ecuador vs Estonia

PR China vs Estonia

Estonia vs Canada

Estonia vs Bulgaria

Andorra vs Estonia

Estonia vs Andorra

Estonia vs Croatia

Estonia vs Lithuania

Estonia vs Latvia

Estonia vs Poland

Bulgaria vs Estonia

Belgium vs Estonia

Albania vs Estonia

Hungary vs Estonia

Saudi Arabia vs Estonia

Oman vs Estonia

Notes

References
 RSSSF detailed results
 RSSSF detailed results

2003
2003 national football team results
National